Classe '73 is the sixth studio album by the Italian rapper Bassi Maestro, released in 2003 under Vibrarecords.

Track listing

Link 

2003 albums
Bassi Maestro albums